Robert Ray Wisdom (born September 14, 1953) is an American actor, best known for his roles as Howard "Bunny" Colvin in The Wire,  Norman "Lechero" St. John in Prison Break, and Harold Conway in the 2021 Hulu movie Vacation Friends.

Early life
Wisdom was born to Jamaican parents. He is a graduate of St. Albans School and Columbia University, where he was a star sprinter on the school's track team.

Career
He appeared in four of the five seasons (primarily seasons three and four) of the HBO program The Wire as Howard "Bunny" Colvin. Wisdom had initially auditioned for the role of Stringer Bell. He has also starred in the 2004 films Barbershop 2: Back in Business and Ray, and the 2007 film Freedom Writers. He landed a regular role on season 3 of Prison Break playing the role of a Panamanian drug kingpin named Lechero. He also had recurring roles in the television series Supernatural, Happy Town, and Burn Notice. Wisdom was once a producer for NPR's All Things Considered.

From 2012 to 2013, Wisdom was a series regular in season one of the ABC drama series Nashville, as Coleman Carlisle.

Filmography

Film

Television

Video games

References

External links
 

African-American male actors
American actors of Jamaican descent
American male film actors
American male television actors
American male voice actors
Living people
20th-century American male actors
Place of birth missing (living people)
St. Albans School (Washington, D.C.) alumni
Columbia University alumni
21st-century American male actors
1953 births
20th-century African-American people
21st-century African-American people
Columbia Lions men's track and field athletes